Džungľa (literally: "Jungle") is a borough (city ward) of Košice, Slovakia.

Džungľa gained its distinctive name in the interwar period and was made an official borough in the early 1990s. It is the smallest of all 22 of Košice's boroughs, and is also one of the least populous overall.

The borough is largely focused on housing (with a few hundred residents), industrial areas and shopping centres.

History 

Today's borough of Džungľa developed during the interwar period, its nickname (later adopted as an official name) first appeared in the late 1920s.

Džungľa became a separate borough of Košice, as part of the Košice I district, in 1990.

Statistics

 Area: 
 Population: 697 (December 2017) 
 Density of population: 1500/km2 (December 2017)
 District: Košice I
 Mayor: Adriana Šebeščáková Balogová (as of 2018 elections)

Gallery 

Photos

Maps of the area

References

External links

 Article on the Džungľa borough at Cassovia.sk
 Official website of Košice

Boroughs of Košice